Sazkar Hanım ("harmony"; born Fatma Zekiye Maan; 8 May 1873 –  1945) was the ninth consort of Sultan Abdul Hamid II of the Ottoman Empire.

Early life
Sazkar Hanım was born on 8 May 1873 in Kayalar, Adapazarı, Istanbul. Born as Fatma Zekiye Maan, she was a member of Abkhazian noble family, Maan. Her father was Recep Bata Bey Maan, the son of Osman Bey Maan, and grandson of Kats Bey Maan. Her mother was Rukiye Havva Hanım Mikanba, an Abkhazian. She was the first cousin of Behice Hanım, twelfth consort of Sultan Abdul Hamid.

She was presented in the imperial harem by Çorlulizade Mahmud Celaleddin Pasha's Abkhazian consorte, Bidar Hanım. Sazkar was tall, with blonde hair and light blue-green eyes.

Marriage
Sazkar Hanım married Abdul Hamid in 1890 in the Yıldız Palace. She was given the title of "BaşIkbal". On 15 June 1891, a year after the marriage, she gave birth to her only child, a daughter, Refia Sultan. Sazkar became close friends with Peyveste Hanim, another consort of Abdülhamid II. On 27 April 1909, Abdul Hamid was deposed, and sent into exile in Thessaloniki. Sazkar was closed to Abdul Hamid, and accompanied him for some time, and returned to Istanbul in 1910. Here she settled with her daughter at her Palace located in Yeniköy. Later, she settled down in Şişli with Peyveste Hanım, her favourite among her husband’s consort. Their rooms were on the same floor and every day they took coffee together and reminisced about the past. As Şehzade Abdürrahim lived close by, he used to visit often. After Thessaloniki fell to Greece in 1912, Abdul Hamid also returned to Istanbul, and settled in the Beylerbeyi Palace, where he died in 1918.

Widowhood and death
At the exile of the imperial family in March 1924, Sazkar went to Beirut, Lebanon with her daughter, although as a consort and not a blood member of the family he could have remained in Turkey. When her daughter died in 1938, she moved to Damascus, Syria, to be near her daughter's grave and where she died in 1945. She was buried in the city, next to her daughter in the cemetery of the Sulaymaniyya Takiyya, Damascus, Syria.

Issue

See also
Ikbal (title)
Ottoman Imperial Harem
List of consorts of the Ottoman sultans

References

Sources

 

1873 births
1945 deaths
19th-century consorts of Ottoman sultans
People from the Ottoman Empire of Abkhazian descent
Abdul Hamid II
20th-century consorts of Ottoman sultans